The Women's 100m Freestyle event at the 10th FINA World Aquatics Championships swam on 24–25 July 2003 in Barcelona, Spain. Preliminary and semifinal heats were swum on July 24; the Final swam in the evening session on July 25.

Prior to the event, the World (WR) and Championship (CR) records were:
WR: 53.77 swum by Inge de Bruijn (Netherlands) on September 20, 2000, in Sydney, Australia
CR: 54.01 swum by Jingyi Le (China) on September 5, 1994, in Rome, Italy

Results

Final

Semifinals

Preliminaries

References

Swimming at the 2003 World Aquatics Championships
2003 in women's swimming